The Nerang Bulls Rugby Union Football Club is an Australian rugby union football club that competes in the Gold Coast and District Rugby Union competition. The club is based in Nerang, Queensland on  Queensland's Gold Coast.

History
In 1983, the Nerang Bulls Rugby Union Club was formed and were located at Carrara oval. During 1983, the Bulls fielded one senior team and in 1984 they fielded two senior teams. The club spent two seasons at Carrara before moving to Glennon Park in Nerang in 1985.

See also

 Sports on the Gold Coast, Queensland
 Rugby union in Queensland
 List of Australian rugby union teams

References

External links

Rugby union teams in Queensland
Rugby clubs established in 1983
1983 establishments in Australia
Rugby union teams on the Gold Coast, Queensland